Eni is an Italian oil and gas corporation.

Eni or ENI may refer to:

Businesses and organisations
 Escuela Nacional de Inteligencia, the Argentine intelligence academy
 Groupe des écoles nationales d’ingénieurs (Groupe ENI), a French engineering school network

People 
 Eni of East Anglia, 7th-century Anglo-Saxon royal
 Eni Faleomavaega (1943–2017), American Samoan politician
 Eni Gesinde (born 1982), Nigerian footballer
 Eni Imami (born 1992), Albanian footballer
 Eni Llazani (born 1989), Albanian basketball player
 Eni Malaj (born 1989), Albanian footballer
 Eni Njoku (1917–1974), Nigerian botanist and educator
 Oshrat Eni (born 1984), Israeli footballer

Other uses 
 E.N.I. (band), a Croatian pop band
 Eni (letter), a letter of the Georgian scripts
 ENI number, a registration for ships in Europe
 El Nido Airport (IATA code: ENI), in the Philippines
 European Neighbourhood Instrument, a European Union policy
 European Neuroscience Institute Göttingen (ENI-G)

See also
Ani Rural District, Iran